Arhopala kurzi is a butterfly in the family Lycaenidae. It was described by William Lucas Distant in 1885. It is found in the Indomalayan realm (Peninsular Malaya).

References

External links
Arhopala Boisduval, 1832 at Markku Savela's Lepidoptera and Some Other Life Forms. Retrieved June 3, 2017.

Arhopala
Butterflies described in 1885